Lieutenant General Henry Shrapnel (3 June 1761 – 13 March 1842) was a British Army officer whose name has entered the English language as the inventor of the shrapnel shell.

Henry Shrapnel was born at Midway Manor in Bradford-on-Avon, Wiltshire, England, the ninth child of Zachariah Shrapnel and his wife Lydia.

In 1784, while a lieutenant in the Royal Artillery, he perfected, with his own resources, an invention of what he called "spherical case" ammunition: a hollow cannonball filled with lead shot that burst in mid-air. He successfully demonstrated this in 1787 at Gibraltar. He intended the device as an anti-personnel weapon.

In 1803, the British Army adopted a similar but elongated explosive shell which immediately acquired the inventor's name. It has lent the term "shrapnel" to fragmentation from artillery shells and fragmentation in general ever since, long after it was replaced by high explosive rounds. Until the end of World War I, the shells were still manufactured according to his original principles.

Shrapnel served in Flanders, where he was wounded in 1793. He was promoted to major on 1 November 1803 after eight years as a captain. After his invention's success in battle at Fort Nieuw-Amsterdam, Suriname, on 30 April 1804, Shrapnel was promoted to lieutenant colonel on 20 July 1804, less than nine months later.

In 1814, the British Government recognized Shrapnel's contribution by awarding him £1,200 (UK£  in ) a year for life. Bureaucracy however prevented him from receiving the full benefit of this award. He was appointed to the office of Colonel-Commandant, Royal Artillery, on 6 March 1827. He rose to the rank of lieutenant-general on 10 January 1837.

Shrapnel lived at Peartree House, near Peartree Green, Southampton from about 1835 until his death.

References
Notes

Citations

1761 births
1842 deaths
Military personnel from Wiltshire
People from Bradford-on-Avon
British Army lieutenant generals
Royal Artillery officers
British Army personnel of the French Revolutionary Wars
English inventors